Peter McCallum Dowding SC (born 6 October 1943) is an Australian lawyer and former politician who was the 24th Premier of Western Australia from 25 February 1988 until his resignation on 12 February 1990. He was a member of parliament from 1980 to 1990.

Dowding graduated from the University of Western Australia with a Bachelor of Laws, and he subsequently worked as a solicitor and barrister. In 1980, he was elected to the North Province of the Western Australian Legislative Council, representing the Labor Party. He entered the Burke Cabinet when Labor won the 1983 state election and changed ministries several times over the ensuing years due to cabinet reshuffles. At the 1986 state election, Dowding transferred to the Legislative Assembly, winning the safe seat of Maylands.

In December 1987, Premier Brian Burke announced that he would resign on 25 February 1988. Burke picked Dowding as his preferred replacement, with a secret opinion poll showing that he was the best candidate for the party to choose. After several other contenders dropped out of the contest, Dowding was voted in unanimously as the party's leader on 30 December. He was sworn in as the premier as scheduled on 25 February 1988.

Following controversy caused by WA Inc, Dowding became unpopular. On 12 February 1990, he resigned as premier and leader of the Labor Party ahead of almost certain defeat in a Labor Party leadership spill. He was replaced by Carmen Lawrence. Dowding soon resigned from parliament, and went back to practising law. The royal commission into WA Inc was scathing of Dowding, saying that he "presided over a disastrous series of decisions".

Early life and career
Dowding was born on 6 October 1943 in Melbourne, Victoria, Australia. His parents were Keith McCallum Dowding, a high-profile Presbyterian minister and far-left political activist, and Marjorie Stuart D'Arcey, who died of suicide when Peter was eight. He was educated at various schools in Australia and the United Kingdom, including Caulfield Grammar School in Melbourne, Kelvinside Academy in Glasgow, The Scots College in Sydney, and Hale School in Perth, Western Australia. As a teenager, he joined the Australian Labor Party. Keith was also a member of the Labor Party and had attempted to enter Federal Parliament several times, but he was expelled in the early 1960s for his opposition to the White Australia policy. Dowding earned a Bachelor of Laws degree from the University of Western Australia in 1964, and was admitted to the bar in December 1966.

In 1970, Dowding married his first wife, with whom he had two sons. Between 1967 and 1972, he represented over 100 Vietnam War conscientious objectors, successfully defending over 30 of them. He also represented protesters who had been arrested at the Naval Communication Station Harold E. Holt, a U.S.-operated naval base in Exmouth. The case gained notoriety when Dowding proved that the police officers involved in the incident had swapped their name badges to prevent them from being identified. In 1968, Dowding entered into partnership as Paterson and Dowding, where he concentrated on family law, soon becoming the best divorce lawyer in Perth according to The Sydney Morning Herald. He became a senior partner in 1977 and he sold out of the firm in 1980. From March 1975 until April 1976, Dowding was on the Kalamunda Shire Council, and in 1976 and 1977, he worked as a notary public with the Aboriginal Legal Service in Port Hedland, during which he met his second wife, a Ngarluma woman from Roebourne.

In 1977, he represented defeated Labor Party candidate Ernie Bridge in a landmark case in the Court of Disputed Returns. At the 1977 state election, Bridge was defeated by Liberal candidate Alan Ridge by 93 votes in the electoral district of Kimberley. The Liberal Party had worked to disenfranchise Aboriginal voters, many of whom were illiterate, by having lawyers stand outside polling stations to question their right to vote. The court found that over 90 people were illegally prevented from voting, and so the results were overturned. The resulting 1977 Kimberley state by-election saw Ridge win again. In 1980, he married his second wife, with whom he had one daughter and one son.

Early political career

Ahead of the 1980 Western Australian state election, Dowding put himself forward to be the Labor candidate for the North Province, a Legislative Council seat which covered the northern side of the state, including the Pilbara and the Kimberley. With no other Labor members seeking preselection, he was endorsed as the seat's Labor candidate. At the election, he beat incumbent Liberal Party candidate John Tozer, having been well supported by the province's large Aboriginal population, having promised to help them gain land rights and self-management. His term commenced on 22 May 1980.

Upon Labor's victory at the February 1983 state election under Brian Burke, Dowding was made the minister for mines and the minister for fuel and energy. Dowding's inclusion in the ministry was a surprise, as he was the only one that was not part of Burke's shadow ministry. Dowding was replacing Mike Barnett, who did not nominate himself for the ministry due to family reasons. In 1983, the Department of Mines and the Department of Resource Development merged to form the Department of Minerals and Energy, following a report commissioned by the previous government that was critical of the interdepartmental conflicts which occurred. This necessitated a cabinet reshuffle. On 23 December 1983, Dowding became the minister for planning, the minister for employment and training, and the minister for consumer affairs. At a cabinet reshuffle on 20 December 1984, he relinquished being the minister for planning and he became the minister for industrial relations in addition to being the minister for employment and training, and the minister for consumer affairs.

At the February 1986 state election, Dowding left his Legislative Council seat to contest the Legislative Assembly seat of Maylands in a move widely seen as a step towards becoming premier. Maylands was a safe seat for the Labor Party, and was held by the retiring John Harman. Dowding retained the seat for the Labor Party at the election, after which, he stopped being the minister for consumer affairs. In Perth, Dowding lived in the suburb of Mount Lawley. From October 1986, in addition to his two prior ministries, he became the minister assisting the minister for public sector management. He was given the responsibility of implementing the changes recommended in a parliamentary white paper, Managing change in the public sector, which included the public sector being more selective with choosing employees, attempting to retain graduates, and cutting back on staff in health. In his role as minister for employment and training, he embarked on a tour of Europe, where he developed an interest in Sweden's regulated economy. It was in Stockholm where he met his third wife. He convinced her to move to Australia, and in October 1987, they married at the old Perth Observatory. His positions were renamed to the minister for productivity and employment, and the minister for labour in a March 1987 cabinet reshuffle. He also became the minister for works and services in that reshuffle.

Premier
After months of speculation, in December 1987, Burke announced his intention to resign as premier and from parliament on 25 February 1988. Dowding was the most likely candidate to replace him as Burke had named him as his preferred successor. A secret opinion poll conducted by the Labor Party in March 1987 found that Dowding was the most "electorally acceptable" candidate, however certain trade unions and sections of the Labor Party disliked Dowding. Other contenders were David Parker, Bob Pearce, and Julian Grill, however they all pulled out of contention before the 30 December Labor caucus vote due to Burke's influence, the opinion poll, and the need for the party to be united. Dowding was unanimously elected as the leader of the Labor Party and Parker was unanimously elected as deputy leader, replacing Mal Bryce, who had also announced his intention to resign.

Dowding and his ministry were sworn in by Governor Gordon Reid on 25 February 1988. Dowding gave himself the positions of treasurer, minister for productivity, minister for public sector management and minister for women's interests. The changes made to cabinet were designed to replace ministers who had accrued controversy in their roles. This meant that Gordon Hill was replaced as the minister for police by Ian Taylor and Pearce was replaced as the minister for education by Carmen Lawrence, a cabinet newcomer.

Dowding was not part of any Labor Party faction. When asked about this, he replied that "my heart beats in the direction of giving Labor the opportunity to govern. Social issues are not the prerogative of the Left. The Left gets sidetracked and the Right gets sidetracked. If my heart beats anywhere, it's in the centre."

The March 1988 by-elections in the electoral districts of Ascot and Balga had swings away from the Labor Party of 14.8% and 21.3% respectively, which Dowding blamed on both the state and federal governments. The high informal vote caused the Dowding government to reverse the Burke government's 1987 addition of ticket voting in the Legislative Assembly.

An opinion poll released in April 1988 found that 48% of those surveyed had no opinion on Dowding's performance. In an effort to increase his profile, the Labor Party ran a television advertisement campaign, Dowding released a comprehensive development strategy, and he adopted a higher profile when dealing with an industrial dispute. Polls in May and June showed that his profile had risen, with the undecided people falling to 22%. Those who rated him as "good" rose from 13% in April to 22% in June, those who rated him as "fair" rose from 33% to 50%, and those who rated him as "poor" stayed steady at 6%.

Although the Labor Government was quite popular at the time, the WA Inc scandal was starting to surface. The stock market crashed in October 1987, which spelled trouble for some of the government's private investments. The Rothwells merchant bank went into liquidation in November 1988. Dowding said the government could lose up to $100 million from the bank's collapse, however opposition frontbencher Bill Hassell said it would cost the government $400 million. The opposition ruled out blocking supply though. In November, the Labor Party paid for a two-minute prime time television commercial where Dowding made a speech promising that no more taxpayer money would be spent on Rothwells.

Additionally, the government was under fire after the Teachers' Credit Society donated $5,000 to the Labor Party in April 1987 after receiving an extension on a loan from the R & I Bank, a state-owned bank. The donation was given back soon afterwards.

In the 1988–89 state budget, there was 23% more spending on education and 26% more spending on police. This meant 1000 more police officers within three years, as well as 500 more teachers and 250 support staff for schools. This was in response to a 1988 national survey which showed that Western Australia had the largest classes in Australia. 66% of junior secondary classes had more than 25 students, and 36% had more than 30 students. The budget also included the release of 2000 state housing homes for sale, and the promise to build an electric railway line to Joondalup at a cost of $124 million.

At the 1989 state election, the Labor Party had a primary vote swing of 10.5% against it, and a two-party-preferred swing of 6.5% against it. Despite this, the party only lost one net seat in the Legislative Assembly, as the largest swings occurred in safe Labor seats and marginal seats generally had smaller swings. Labor's 31 seats out of 57 were enough for a majority. Following the election, Dowding reshuffled his cabinet, removing himself from being the treasurer and the minister for productivity.

Downfall

Within six months of the 1989 election, some Labor MPs were dissatisfied with Dowding, finding him arrogant, rude, and difficult to work with. His popularity was also hurt by the District Court trial of Western Colleries Limited director Tony Lloyd. His defence lawyers had argued that Dowding and Acting Energy Minister Grill had ordered Lloyd to pay off a Rothwells debt using a $15 million cheque. In January 1990, Lloyd was found guilty of acting improperly, making him the first person convicted for an offence relating to WA Inc. After that, opinion polls showed support was as low as 32%. Additionally, the 1990 Australian federal election was coming up, and the Labor Party wanted to limit the seats lost by the party in Western Australia. Having a state leader less associated with WA Inc would have helped with that.

In early 1990, Dowding travelled to the World Economic Forum in Switzerland, after Parker assured him that nothing would happen to his leadership while he was gone. State Secretary Stephen Smith, FMWU Secretary Jim McGinty, and seven Labor politicians – Lawrence, Parker, Taylor, Kay Hallahan, Keith Wilson, Geoff Gallop and Pam Beggs – met together to discuss Peter Dowding's leadership, all deciding that he should be forced out. By 7 February 1990, the majority of the 47 members of the Labor caucus had signed a letter calling for Dowding's resignation. He returned early from the World Economic Forum on 8 February in order to shore up his leadership, spending the next several days speaking to party members in an attempt to ensure their support. He also held a cabinet meeting on 9 February. At a caucus meeting on 12 February, Dowding and Parker resigned from their positions. Lawrence was elected as the leader of the Labor Party and Taylor was elected as the deputy leader. They were sworn in as premier and deputy premier respectively later that day by the acting governor. On that day, Lawrence promised to end WA Inc. Dowding criticised the leadership challenge, saying that the timing was premature and was done to help Labor win the federal election, rather than for what's good for the state.

On 5 April 1990, Parker announced that he would resignation from Parliament later that month. Although he planned on resigning later, Dowding resigned as well on 26 April 1990, allowing by-elections to occur on the same day. Judy Edwards retained the seat for Labor, succeeding Dowding as the member for Maylands at the May by-election.

Lawrence initially resisted calls to establish a royal commission into WA Inc, however she relented in November 1990. The royal commission found that:

Mr Dowding, as premier, presided over a disastrous series of decisions designed to support Rothwells when it was or should have been clear to him and to those ministers closely involved that Rothwells was no longer a viable financial institution. This culminated in the decision to involve the Government, through WAGH, in the Kwinana petrochemical project as a means of removing the Government's contingent liability for certain of the debts of Rothwells. Electoral advantage was preferred to the public interest.

Later life
After leaving parliament, he was admitted as a solicitor in New South Wales and was a partner in Briggs Paul Dowding in Sydney from 1992 to 1994 and a managing partner of DCH Legal Group in Perth from 1993 to 1996. Since 1996, he has practiced family law. In 2002, he was appointed as Senior Counsel in Western Australia. He was a recipient of a Centenary Medal in 2003.

At some point, Dowding divorced his third wife and on Boxing Day 2004, he married for the fourth time at the Round House.

As of 2022, Dowding lives in South Fremantle.

See also
 Electoral results for the district of Maylands
 List of Caulfield Grammar School people
 List of Old Boys of The Scots College (Sydney)
 List of Old Haleians

Notes

References

Bibliography
 
 
 

1943 births
Living people
Premiers of Western Australia
People educated at Caulfield Grammar School
Members of the Western Australian Legislative Assembly
Recipients of the Centenary Medal
People educated at Hale School
Treasurers of Western Australia
Australian Senior Counsel
Members of the Western Australian Legislative Council
University of Western Australia alumni
Australian Labor Party members of the Parliament of Western Australia
People educated at Scots College (Sydney)
Politicians from Melbourne
Energy Ministers of Western Australia
People educated at Kelvinside Academy